Suro (수로) or Sureung (posthumous name: 수릉, 首陵, 42?–199), commonly called Kim Suro, was the legendary founder and Hero King of Geumgwan Gaya (43–532), in southeastern Korea.

Legend 
According to the founding legend of Geumgwan Gaya, which was recorded in the 13th century texts of the chronicle Garakguk-gi and was cited in Samguk Yusa, when the people who were commanded by heaven performed ancestral rites, danced and sang, a gold bowl wrapped in red cloth came down from heaven. There were six eggs in them, and 12 days later six princes were born from the eggs. Suro was the firstborn among them and led the others in setting up six states while asserting the leadership of the Gaya confederacy.

Also according to legend, King Suro's wife, Heo Hwang-ok or Suriratna was a princess from a distant country called Ayuta 아유타, 阿踰, also implied to be in Southern India.

The legend as a whole is seen as indicative of the early view of kings as descended from heaven. Notably, a number of Korean Kingdoms besides the Gaya, made foundation legends with ties to chickens and eggs. Jumong, the founding King of Goguryeo, is said to have been born from an egg laid by Lady Yuhwa; Park Hyeokgeose, the first King of Silla (or Saro-guk) is said to have hatched from an egg discovered in a well; and Kim Al-ji, the progenitor of the Kim dynasty of Silla, is said to have been discovered in Gyerim Forest by Hogong in a golden box, where a rooster was crowing. Aspects of the legend have been mined for information about the customs of Gaya, of which little is known.

Family
Wife: Heo Hwang-ok
1st son: King Geodeung
2nd son: Prince Geochil of the Heo clan (거칠군 허씨, 居漆君 許氏)
3rd son: Prince Seongyeong of the Heo clan (선견왕자 허씨, 仙見王子 許氏)
seven other sons (all becomes buddhist: Haejin (혜진, 慧眞); Gakcho (각초, 覺初); Jigam (지감, 智鑑); Deungyeon (등연, 等演); Dumu (두무, 杜武); Jeonghong (정홍, 淨洪); Gyejang (계장, 戒莊))
1st daughter: Princess Yeongan (영안공주, 永安公主) – married Bae Yeolmun (배열문, 裴烈文).
2nd daughter: Lady Jijinnaerye of the Kim clan (지진내례부인 김씨, 只珍內禮夫人 金氏) – married Seok Guchu (석구추, 昔仇鄒).

Incorporation of tomb into the Silla ancestor worship 
At the time of King Munmu, the spirit tablet of Suro was temporarily respected along with fellow Silla Kings, as Munmu was his 15th grandson. According to Samguk Yusa, Munmu ordered the Jesa of King Suro.

In modern culture

Tomb and descendants
A tomb attributed to King Suro is still maintained in modern-day Gimhae. Members of the Gimhae Kim clan, who continue to play important roles in Korean life today, trace their ancestry to King Suro, as do the members of the Incheon Yi clan and Gimhae Heo clan; they did not inter-marry until the beginning of the 20th century. A Memorial Park for Kim Suro and his wife Heo Hwang-ok is being built in Ayodhya, India jointly by South Korean Government and Indian Government to strengthen relationship between both countries on the grounds of history and cultural heritage. Ayodhya and Gimhae became sister cities in 2001.

Television series
 Portrayed by Ji Sung and Park Gun-tae in the 2010 MBC TV series Kim Su-ro, The Iron King.

See also 
 List of monarchs of Korea
 History of Korea
 Three Kingdoms of Korea

References

Bibliography

External links
Tomb of King Suro Life in Korea
Gaya Culture Festival
Kim Su-ro, The Iron King, TV drama from MBC

Gaya rulers
Gimhae Kim clan
2nd-century monarchs in Asia
1st-century monarchs in Asia
199 deaths